Vibrato is the 12th studio album by Paul Gilbert, released on October 15, 2012. The album is half instrumental.

Track listing

Personnel
 Paul Gilbert – lead guitar, vocals
 Jeff Bowders – drums
 Emi Gilbert – keyboards
 Thomas Lang – drums
 Kelly LeMieux – bass guitar
 Craig Martini – bass guitar
 Tony Spinner – rhythm guitar, vocals

Production
 John Greenberg - management
 Tim Heyne - management
 Ace Baker – engineering
 Dave Brubeck – songwriting
 Willie Dixon – songwriting
 Howe – songwriting
 Paul Logus – mastering
 Jun Murakawa – engineering
 Jay Ruston – mixing album
 James Chiang - photography and images album

References

http://www.allmusic.com/album/vibrato-mw0002419208

Paul Gilbert albums
2012 albums
Shrapnel Records albums